Ahigal is a municipality in the province of Cáceres and autonomous community of Extremadura, Spain.

Toponym
The origin of the series of place names "Ahigal" is a place name created from a plant. Figal is used as a surname in Asturias: the figal is the fig tree; many variations still exist such as La Figar, La Figal or Figares in Asturian place names. Like in Latin, the feminine gender of the tree name is maintained.

Geographical limits
Ahigal is bordered by:

Cerezo to the north;
Guijo de Granadilla to the east;
Oliva de Plasencia to the south-east;
Valdeobispo to the south-west;
Santibáñez el Bajo to the west.

History
At the fall of the old regime the area was formed into a constitutional municipality in the Extremadura region, judicial district of Granadilla, then known as Aigal, which, in the census of 1842, had 250 homes and 1370 residents

References

Municipalities in the Province of Cáceres